

History
The Cardè Bridge is the first reinforced concrete bridge built over the Po. It is located in Cardè, in the Province of Cuneo, in the Italian region Piedmont. The works for its realization started on 5 February and finished on 7 December 1914. The project was planned by Ingegneri Giay Emilio & Eugenio of Turin. Before its construction, a wooden bridge linked Cardè to Villafranca Piemonte and Barge but it was often ruined by the floods. On 9 February 2004, during the central pillar maintenance works, the bridge subsided. Nowaday the structure is condemned, moreover the works for its restoration are going on. Meanwhile, a Bailey bridge was built to let the vehicles but trucks pass.

Gallery

References

Bridges in Piedmont
Villafranca Piemonte
Barge, Piedmont